Desert Edge is a census-designated place in Riverside County, California, United States. The 2010 United States census reported Desert Edge's population was 3,822.

Geography
According to the United States Census Bureau, the CDP covers an area of 2.3 square miles (5.8 km), all of it land.

Demographics

At the 2010 census Desert Edge had a population of 3,822. The racial makeup of Desert Edge was 3,051 (79.8%) White (65.5% Non-Hispanic White), 14 (0.4%) African American, 34 (0.9%) Native American, 28 (0.7%) Asian, 1 (0.0%) Pacific Islander, 624 (16.3%) from other races, and 70 (1.8%) from two or more races. Hispanic or Latino of any race were 1,220 persons (31.9%).

The whole population lived in households, no one lived in non-institutionalized group quarters and no one was institutionalized.

There were 1,969 households, 237 (12.0%) had children under the age of 18 living in them, 869 (44.1%) were opposite-sex married couples living together, 108 (5.5%) had a female householder with no husband present, 49 (2.5%) had a male householder with no wife present.  There were 106 (5.4%) unmarried opposite-sex partnerships, and 33 (1.7%) same-sex married couples or partnerships. 783 households (39.8%) were one person and 509 (25.9%) had someone living alone who was 65 or older. The average household size was 1.94.  There were 1,026 families (52.1% of households); the average family size was 2.59.

The age distribution was 514 people (13.4%) under the age of 18, 127 people (3.3%) aged 18 to 24, 474 people (12.4%) aged 25 to 44, 884 people (23.1%) aged 45 to 64, and 1,823 people (47.7%) who were 65 or older.  The median age was 63.8 years. For every 100 females, there were 92.0 males.  For every 100 females age 18 and over, there were 89.6 males.

There were 3,492 housing units at an average density of 1,540.0 per square mile, of the occupied units 1,707 (86.7%) were owner-occupied and 262 (13.3%) were rented. The homeowner vacancy rate was 5.5%; the rental vacancy rate was 21.3%.  3,222 people (84.3% of the population) lived in owner-occupied housing units and 600 people (15.7%) lived in rental housing units.

According to the 2010 United States Census, Desert Edge had a median household income of $35,089, with 22.4% of the population living below the federal poverty line.

References

Census-designated places in Riverside County, California
Census-designated places in California